Katta may refer to:

Places
 Katta District, Miyagi, Miyagi Prefecture, Japan
 Katta, a town in Sindhudurg District, Maharashtra, India
 Oslo Cathedral School, or "Katta", Oslo, Norway

People
 Deva Katta, Indian American film director and screenwriter
 Katta Subramanya Naidu (born 1960), Indian politician in Karnataka
 Katta Subba Rao (1940–1988), Indian film director
 Katta Shekar Reddy, Indian journalist

See also
 Kata (disambiguation)
 Katar (disambiguation)
 Katha (disambiguation)
 Khata, a Tibetan ceremonial scarf